Hallie Rubenhold (born 1971 in Los Angeles) is an American-born British historian and author. Her work specializes in 18th and 19th century social history and women's history. Her 2019 book The Five, about the lives of the women murdered by Jack the Ripper, was shortlisted for the Wolfson History Prize and won the Baillie Gifford Prize for Non-fiction. Rubenhold's focus on the victims of murder (frequently women), rather than on the identity or the acts of the perpetrator, has been credited with changing attitudes to the proper commemoration of such crimes and to the appeal and  function of the true crime genre.

Early life
Rubenhold was born in Los Angeles to a British father and American mother  and undertook a BA in History at the University of Massachusetts, Amherst. She then gained an MA in British History and History of Art and an MPhil in History from the University of Leeds, on the subject of marriage and child-rearing in the eighteenth century. Rubenhold has also worked in the commercial art world for Philip Mould and as an assistant curator for the National Portrait Gallery.

Career
In 2005, she wrote an accessible history of Harris's List of Covent Garden Ladies and its author in her book The Covent Garden Ladies: Pimp General Jack and the Extraordinary Story of Harris's List, and, in 2008, she published The Harlot's Handbook: Harris's List, a selection of the directories' "funniest, rudest and most surreal entries". The BBC later adapted the material for a documentary, presented by Rubenhold herself called The Harlot's Handbook. 

Rubenhold appears regularly as an expert contributor on history documentaries for British and US networks. In the past she has appeared on BBC 2's Balderdash and Piffle, discussing the origins of merkins with burlesque star Immodesty Blaize and on BBC 4's Age of Excess. She has contributed to the BBC series The Beauty of Maps and to History Cold Case and to Channel 4's Titanic: The Mission, as well as the Travel Channel's Mysteries at the Museum and Private Lives of the Monarchs. She also works as a historical consultant for period dramas, including Jonathan Strange & Mr Norrell (BBC) and Harlots (Hulu / Amazon).

Her book, Lady Worsley's Whim, published in November 2008, is an account of one of the eighteenth century's most sensational sex scandals, the criminal conversation case of Sir Richard Worsley against Maurice George Bisset for having committed adultery with Seymour Dorothy Fleming, a member of The New Female Coterie established by Caroline Stanhope, Countess of Harrington. It featured as BBC Radio 4's Book of the Week from 3 November 2008 and was adapted into a 90-minute drama for BBC 2 entitled The Scandalous Lady W, broadcast on 17 August 2015, and starring Natalie Dormer.

Rubenhold has written two novels, both set during the eighteenth century. The French Lesson is set during the Terror in Revolutionary Paris. It follows on from her first novel, Mistress of My Fate, the first book in the Confessions of Henrietta Lightfoot series. Both books are written as an hommage to classic works of eighteenth and early nineteenth century literature.

Her most recent book is The Five, a biography of the five victims of Jack the Ripper. It won the £50,000 Baillie Gifford Prize in 2019 and was named the Hay Festival Book of the Year. It was also shortlisted for the 2020 Wolfson History Prize.

Rubenhold is married and lives in London.

Bibliography
 (2005:a) The Covent Garden Ladies: Pimp General Jack and the extraordinary story of "Harris' List" . Stroud: Tempus 
 (ed.) (2005:b) "Harris's List of Covent-Garden Ladies": sex in the city in Georgian Britain. Stroud: Tempus
 (2008:a) Lady Worsley’s Whim; An Eighteenth Century Tale of Sex, Scandal and Divorce.  Chatto & Windus.  US title: The Lady in Red
 (2007:b) The Harlot's Handbook: Harris's List. Tempus
 (2011) Mistress of My Fate; The Confessions of Henrietta Lightfoot Transworld
 (2015) The French Lesson Transworld
 (2019) The Five: The Untold Lives of the Women Killed by Jack the Ripper Doubleday

References

External links
Rubenhold's personal website

1971 births
Living people
American emigrants to the United Kingdom
University of Massachusetts Amherst alumni
Alumni of the University of Leeds
British historians
21st-century American historians
People from Los Angeles
American women historians
American people of British descent
21st-century American women writers
British women historians
American non-fiction crime writers
British non-fiction crime writers
Historians from California
Social historians